"Headz Up" is the third single by the American alternative Southern rap sextet Kentucky rap group Nappy Roots, from their 2002 debut album Watermelon, Chicken & Gritz.

Chart positions

References

2002 singles
Nappy Roots songs
2002 songs